St Patrick's Church is the name of two Roman Catholic Parish Churches in Leeds, West Yorkshire. The original church was built from 1889 to 1891, designed by John Kelly and is a Grade II listed building. It is situated on Rider Street, next to the New York Road and East Street Arts. In April 2001, St Patrick's Church moved to Torre Road. The original one closed and the new church opened the next day. The new St Patrick's Church is located on Torre Road in the east end of the city.

History

Construction
In 1889, building work started on St Patrick's Church on Rider Street. It was designed by John Kelly, who also designed All Saints' Church, Petersham, London, Sacred Heart Church, Teddington and St Patrick's Church, Soho Square. It was opened in 1891.

Move
Leading up to April 2001, construction work began on a new St Patrick's Church on Torre Road in Leeds. When it was finished, the old one closed and the new one opened the next day. The original church was shut for asbestos yet remains and is now occupied by the West Yorkshire Playhouse and has East Street Arts located next to it.

Parish
St Patrick's Church has two Sunday Masses: Saturday 6:00pm and 10:00am on Sunday morning.

See also
 Roman Catholic Diocese of Leeds

References

External links
 
 Diocese of Leeds site

Saint Patrick
Grade II listed churches in West Yorkshire
Grade II listed Roman Catholic churches in England
Gothic Revival church buildings in England
Roman Catholic churches completed in 1891
19th-century Roman Catholic church buildings in the United Kingdom
Gothic Revival architecture in Leeds
Roman Catholic Diocese of Leeds